Indian Creek is a stream in Crawford and Dent counties in the U.S. state of Missouri. It is a tributary of Huzzah Creek.

Indian Creek was named for the fact traces of Native American settlement were found along its course.

See also
List of rivers of Missouri

References

Rivers of Crawford County, Missouri
Rivers of Dent County, Missouri
Rivers of Missouri
Tributaries of the Meramec River
Native American history of Missouri